The WHDH-TV tower is a free-standing lattice tower with a triangular cross section located in the Newton Upper Falls section of Newton, Massachusetts. It built in 1960 by RKO General and is currently owned by Sunbeam Television, which uses it to transmit its Boston television stations, WHDH (channel 7) and WLVI (channel 56), which shares WHDH's channel spectrum. It was originally built for RKO-owned WNAC-TV, the original occupant of channel 7, until it surrendered its license in May 1982 due to long-standing issues with its parent company, when the tower and studio assets were transferred to the new channel 7 licensee.

It is currently the second tallest free-standing lattice tower in the United States after the WITI TV Tower in Milwaukee and the 11th tallest in the world.

See also 
 List of tallest towers in the world
 List of tallest freestanding structures in the world
 List of tallest freestanding steel structures

References

External links 
 ASR Registration 1005862
 Tower Site of the Week (2009)
 Tower photo

Lattice towers
Towers in Massachusetts
Buildings and structures in Newton, Massachusetts
Radio masts and towers in the United States
Towers completed in 1960